The Metarbelidae are a family of the Cossoidea also called the carpenter or goat moths, and is sometimes treated as a subfamily, Metarbelinae of the Cossidae. No synapomorphies are shared with the Cossidae based on adult morphology. The family Metarbelidae was first described by Embrik Strand in 1909.

Distribution
The family Metarbelidae is most diverse on the African mainland (occurs only south of the Sahara). The family is absent in the New World, Europe, northern Asia, Australia and have a very scattered occurrence on Madagascar and in the Oriental Region through the southwestern and southern Arabian Peninsula.

Genera
 Aethiopina Gaede, 1929
 Arbelodes Karsch, 1896
 Bjoernstadia Lehmann, 2012
 Dianfosseya Lehmann, 2014
 Encaumaptera Hampson, 1893
 Haberlandia Lehmann, 2011
 Indarbela T. B. Fletcher, 1922
 Janegoodallia Lehmann, 2014
 Kroonia Lehmann, 2010
 Lebedodes Holland, 1893
 Lutzkobesia I. Lehmann, 2019
 Marshalliana Aurivillius, 1901
 Melisomimas Jordan, 1907
 Metarbela Holland, 1893
 Metarbelodes Strand, 1909
 Mountelgonia Lehmann, 2013
 Moyencharia Lehmann, 2013
 Ortharbela Aurivillius, 1910
 Paralebedella Strand, 1923
 Saalmulleria Mabille, 1891
 Salagena Walker, 1865
 Shimonia I. Lehmann & Rajaei, 2013
 Squamicapilla Schultze, 1908
 Squamura Heylaerts, 1890
 Stenagra Hampson, 1920
 Stueningeria I. Lehmann, 2019
 Subarchaeopacha Dufrane, 1945
Tearbela Yakovlev & Zolotuhin, 2021
 Teragra Walker, 1855

Former genera
 Catarbelana Bethune-Baker, 1908

References

 , 1997: Metarbela haberlandorum sp. nov., a new moth from Kenya (Lepidoptera: Metarbelidae). Nachrichten Entomologischer Verein Apollo 18 (1): 45–53.
 , 2007: Metarbelidae. Esperiana Buchreihe zur Entomologie Memoir 4: 169–185.
 , 2008: Ten new species of Metarbelidae (Lepidoptera: Cossoidea) from the coastal forests and the Eastern Arc Mountains of Kenya and Tanzania, including one species From Two Upland Forests. Journal of East African Natural History 97 (1): 43–82. .
 , 2010: A new genus of Metarbelidae (Lepidoptera: Cossoidea) from the Afrotropical Region with the description of seven new species. Esperiana Buchreihe zur Entomologie Memoir 5: 294–322.
 , 2010: A revision of the genus Arbelodes Karsch (Lepidoptera: Cossoidea: Metarbelidae)from southeast-central and southern Africa with the description of thirteen new species. Published by the author. Hamburg, 82 pages, 8 b/w plates, 5 colour plates.
 , 2011: The description of a new genus and twenty-three new species of Metarbelidae (Lepidoptera: Cossoidea) from the lowland tropical rain forests of the Guineo-Congolian Region with notes on habitats and biogeography. Published by the author. Hamburg, 67 pages, 10 b/w plates, 6 colour plates, 1 coloured map.
 , 2011: New and little known species of Lepidoptera of southwestern Africa. Esperiana Buchreihe zur Entomologie Memoir 6: 146–261.
 , 2012: Description of a new genus and species of Metarbelidae (Lepidoptera, Cossoidea) from the Albertine Rift region of Tanzania, East Africa. Norwegian Journal of Entomology 59: 234–240.
 , 2013: Description of two new genera and ten new species of Metarbelidae (Lepidoptera: Cossoidea) from western, north-central and eastern Africa with notes on habitats and biogeography. Published by the author. Hamburg, 82 pages, 10 b/w plates, 5 colour plates, 2 coloured maps.
 , 2013: Description of a new genus and three new species of Metarbelidae (Lepidoptera: Cossoidea) from East and Central Africa, with notes on biogeography. Bonn Zoological Bulletin 62(1): 100–110. Full article: .
 , 2014: Description of two new genera and two new species of Metarbelidae (Lepidoptera: Cossoidea) from the Northeastern Congolian Lowland Forests Ecoregion (Central Africa). Zootaxa 3895 (4): 570–580.
 , 2019b: First revision of the family Metarbelidae Strand, 1909(Lepidoptera: Cossoidea Leach, 1815) and a phylogeny based on adult morphology of 60 genera from the Afrotropical and Oriental Region. Doctoral Dissertation. Rheinische Friedrich-Wilhelms-Universität Bonn URN: urn:nbn:de:hbz:5n-55423: 1–397.
, 2021: Revision of the family Metarbelidae (Lepidoptera) of the Oriental Region. VI. Genus Tearbela Yakovlev & Zolotuhin gen. nov. from the Bangladesh and Marcopoloia dea (Swinhoe, 1890) comb. nov. Ecologica Montenegrina, 45, 43–47. doi: 10.37828/em.2021.45.8

External links

Metarbelinae
Moth families